Mexico competed at the 2020 Winter Youth Olympics in Lausanne, Switzerland from 9 to 22 January 2020. They competed with 7 athletes in 2 sports. Luisa Wilson, who competed on the Yellow team of the Ice hockey – Girls' 3x3 mixed tournament, became the first Mexican to win a medal in any Winter Olympic sports category.

Medalists
Medals awarded to participants of mixed-NOC teams are represented in italics. These medals are not counted towards the individual NOC medal tally.

Alpine skiing

Girls

Ice hockey

Mixed NOC 3x3 tournament 

Boys
Alejandro Javier
Diego Rodríguez
Daniel Valencia

Girls
Ximena González
Melanie Hernández
Luisa Wilson

See also

Mexico at the 2020 Summer Olympics

References

2020 in Mexican sports
Nations at the 2020 Winter Youth Olympics
Mexico at the Youth Olympics